Dennis or Denis O'Brien may refer to:

Dennis O'Brien (ice hockey) (born 1949), professional ice hockey player in the National Hockey League
Dennis M. O'Brien (born 1952), former Speaker, PA House of Representatives, and member, 167th District
Denis O'Brien (born 1958), Irish entrepreneur Charman of Digicel
Denis O'Brien (footballer) (born 1952), Australian footballer for Collingwood
Denis O'Brien (police officer) (1899–1942), veteran of the Easter Rising and the Irish Republican Army
Denis O'Brien (politician) (1837–1909), New York State Attorney General
Denis O'Brien (producer) (1941–2021), co-founder of HandMade Films with George Harrison
Denis Patrick O'Brien (born 1939), English economist
Denny O'Brien (born 1973), American columnist, journalist and radio commentator
G. Dennis O'Brien (born 1931), former president of the University of Rochester